Lakereia was a town in ancient Thessaly.

Its site is tentatively located near the modern Marmariani Magoula.

References

Populated places in ancient Thessaly
Former populated places in Greece